The 1st constituency of French Guiana is one of two French National Assembly constituencies in the French Guiana département. Located in the eastern third of the department, the constituency contains the capital city of Cayenne.

The constituency has been represented by Jean-Victor Castor of the Decolonization and Social Emancipation Movement since 2022.

Deputies

Recent election results

2022
In 2022, Jean-Victor Castor of the pro-independence Decolonization and Social Emancipation Movement was elected over Yvane Goua. Castor was supported by the New Anticapitalist Party (NPA), while Goua was supported by La France Insoumise.
 
 
 
|-
| colspan="8" bgcolor="#E9E9E9"|
|-

2017
In 2017, Serville was narrowly reelected against 2012 rival Joëlle Prévot-Madère, who was running this time as a member La République En Marche!.

2012
In 2012, Christiane Taubira chose not to run for reelection following her appointment as Minister of Justice. Gabriel Serville, a former mayor of Matoury running as a member of the Guianese Socialist Party, defeated Joëlle Prévot-Madère, the president of CPGME Guyana.

2007
In 2007, Taubira was elected for a fourth and final term versus Rémy-Louis Budoc (UMP), who she also faced in 2002. During the 2007 contest, which took place just weeks after Nicolas Sarkozy's election as president, Taubira stated that she was "approached" by Sarkozy's associates about the possibility of joining the government of François Fillon. Budoc pushed back against the claim, arguing that "[Taubira] criticized Nicolas Sarkozy too unfairly to deserve to enter this government".

References

Sources
 French Interior Ministry results website: 

 

French legislative constituencies